Gregory Holst (born February 21, 1954 in Montreal, Quebec) is a Canadian-Austrian professional ice hockey coach and a former professional ice hockey player who played eleven games in the National Hockey League.

He is currently serving as head coach of Austrian EK Zell am See in the Alps Hockey League.

Playing career 
Holst played at the University of New Brunswick until 1973. He is a member of UNB's 1970's "All-Decade" team. He then enjoyed a highly productive 1973-74 season with the Kingston Canadians of the Ontario Junior Hockey League, tallying 33 goals and 47 assists in 62 contests. Holst then continued his scoring pace the following season with 33 goals and 37 assists in 62 games for the Winston-Salem Polar Twins of the Southern Hockey League.

He made his NHL debut with the New York Rangers during the 1975-76 season and mostly spent time with their affiliate in the American Hockey League (AHL), the Providence Reds, tallying 37 goals and 44 assists in 69 games that season en route to AHL Rookie of the Year honors. He played nine more NHL contests for the Rangers over the following two years, splitting time between the Rangers and AHL's New Haven Nighthawks.

In 1978 Holst joined Innsbrucker EV of Austria's top division, the Bundesliga. He became one of the most famous Canadian players in Austria and dominated the league while playing for Innsbruck, Wiener EV, Salzburger EC, Villacher SV and EC Graz over the years. Holst received Austrian citizenship and made the Austrian national team, representing the country at four World Championships (Group B). He finished his active career in 1993. Holst played 540 games in the Austrian league, scoring 522 goals. He had his jersey number 14 retired by Innsbrucker EV.

Coaching career 
After the end of his playing days, Holst returned to his native Canada, where he started a hockey school, and then returned to Austria to pursue his coaching career. He coached second-division side EHC Wattens in 1996-97, before joining the coaching staff of the Austrian ice hockey federation in 1997. Until 2002, he served in various positions, including head coach of the U18 and U20 national teams and assistant coach of the men’s national team.

Holst was named head coach of EC VSV of the Austrian top-tier in 2002. During his six-year tenure, he led the club to the 2006 Austrian championship and to the finals in 2003, 2004, 2007.

He took over the head coaching job at HC TWK Innsbruck in December 2008 and remained in that position until the remainder of the season. Holst served as head coach of Ritten Sport of the Italian Serie A in 2011-12 and returned to EC VSV in June 2015 to become director of the club's youth program. In November 2015, he took over the head coaching job.

In November 2018, Holst becomes head coach of EK Zell am See of the Alps Hockey League.

References

External links 

 

1954 births
Canadian ice hockey centres
Kingston Canadians players
Living people
New York Rangers draft picks
New York Rangers players
San Diego Mariners draft picks
Ice hockey people from Montreal
Winston-Salem Polar Twins (SHL) players